Promising Promises is the third full-length studio album by American singer-songwriter Jon McLaughlin. The album was released on May 22, 2012 in the United States. Promising Promises was preceded by its first single, "Summer is Over" (featuring Sara Bareilles), in January 2012.

McLaughlin originally released Forever If Ever on September 6, 2011 in which he financed and self-released the album. He received a new contract with Razor & Tie where his collection of songs from Forever If Ever were re-released with the omission of three old songs and an addition of three new songs.

Track listing

As confirmed by Amazon.com:

Chart performance

Forever If Ever

Promising Promises

References

External links
Razor & Tie
Jon McLaughlin's Facebook

Jon McLaughlin albums
2012 albums
Razor & Tie albums